Maddren is a surname. Notable people with the surname include:

Judy Maddren, Canadian radio announcer
Tim Maddren (born 1984), New Zealand musician
William H. Maddren (1875–1909), American lacrosse coach and physician
Willie Maddren (1951–2000), English footballer and manager